Homalocephala mamaevi is a species of ulidiid or picture-winged fly in the genus Homalocephala of the family Tephritidae.

References

mamaevi
Insects described in 1995